This is a list of wars involving the Federative Republic of Brazil and its predecessor states from the colonial period to the present day.

Colonial Brazil (1500–1815)

United Kingdom of Portugal, Brazil and the Algarves (1815–1822)

Empire of Brazil (1822–1889)

First Brazilian Republic (1889–1930)

Vargas Era (1930–1945)

Fourth Brazilian Republic (1946–1964)

Brazilian military government (1964–1985)

Sixth Brazilian Republic (1985–present)

Other conflicts (slave revolts, mutinies)
 Confederation of the Equator (1824)
 Irish and German Mercenary Soldiers' Revolt (1828)
 Malê Revolt (1835)
 Brazilian Naval Revolt (1893–1894)

Peacekeeping operations
 International Force for East Timor
 2004 Haitian coup d'état
 United Nations Stabilization Mission in Haiti
 United Nations Interim Force in Lebanon

See also
 Military history of Brazil
 Rebellions and revolutions in Brazil

References

Bibliography
 

 
Brazil
Wars
Wars